The 61st New York State Legislature, consisting of the New York State Senate and the New York State Assembly, met from January 2 to April 18, 1838, during the sixth year of William L. Marcy's governorship, in Albany.

Background
Under the provisions of the New York Constitution of 1821, 32 Senators were elected on general tickets in eight senatorial districts for four-year terms. They were divided into four classes, and every year eight Senate seats came up for election. Assemblymen were elected countywide on general tickets to a one-year term, the whole Assembly being renewed annually.

At this time there were two political parties: the Democratic Party and the Whig Party.

In May 1837, the Panic of 1837 broke out, and led to a severe financial crisis. The incumbent Democratic State government was blamed for it by the voters, and the opposing Whig Party won the election in November in a landslide.

Elections
The State election was held from November 6 to 8, 1837. Gulian C. Verplanck (1st D.), Henry A. Livingston (2nd D.), Edward P. Livingston (3rd D.), Martin Lee (4th D.), Avery Skinner (5th D.), Laurens Hull (6th D.), John Maynard (7th D.) and William A. Moseley (8th D.) were elected to the Senate. Edward P. Livingston and Avery Skinner were Democrats, the other six were Whigs.

Sessions
The Legislature met for the regular session at the Old State Capitol in Albany on January 2, 1838; and adjourned on April 18.

Luther Bradish (W) was elected Speaker.

On February 5, the Legislature elected Gamaliel H. Barstow (W) to succeed Abraham Keyser (D) as State Treasurer; and Orville L. Holley (W) to succeed William Campbell (D) as Surveyor General.

On September 12, the Whig state convention met at Utica, and nominated William H. Seward for Governor, and Speaker Luther Bradish for Lieutenant Governor. On the same day, the Democratic state convention met at Herkimer, and nominated Gov. Marcy and Lt. Gov. Tracy unanimously for re-election.

On October 3, a state convention of former Democrats (among them U.S. Senator Nathaniel P. Tallmadge, Congressman John C. Clark and Ex-Assemblyman Judah Hammond) met under the name of "Conservatives" at Syracuse, and endorsed the Whig nominees Seward and Bradish.

State Senate

Districts
 The First District (4 seats) consisted of Kings, New York and Richmond counties.
 The Second District (4 seats) consisted of Dutchess, Orange, Putnam, Queens, Rockland, Suffolk, Sullivan, Ulster and Westchester counties.
 The Third District (4 seats) consisted of Albany, Columbia, Delaware, Greene, Rensselaer, Schenectady and Schoharie counties.
 The Fourth District (4 seats) consisted of Clinton, Essex, Franklin, Hamilton, Herkimer, Montgomery, St. Lawrence, Saratoga, Warren and Washington counties.
 The Fifth District (4 seats) consisted of Jefferson, Lewis, Madison, Oneida, Oswego and Otsego counties.
 The Sixth District (4 seats) consisted of Allegany, Broome, Cattaraugus, Chemung, Chenango, Livingston, Steuben, Tioga and Tompkins counties.
 The Seventh District (4 seats) consisted of Cayuga, Cortland, Onondaga, Ontario, Seneca, Wayne and Yates counties.
 The Eighth District (4 seats) consisted of Chautauqua, Erie, Genesee, Monroe, Niagara and Orleans counties.

Note: There are now 62 counties in the State of New York. The counties which are not mentioned in this list had not yet been established, or sufficiently organized, the area being included in one or more of the abovementioned counties.

Members
The asterisk (*) denotes members of the previous Legislature who continued in office as members of this Legislature.

Senators who resided in counties which were transferred to a different district continued to represent the district in which they were elected.

Employees
 Clerk: John F. Bacon

State Assembly

Districts

 Albany County (3 seats)
 Allegany County (2 seats)
 Broome County (1 seat)
 Cattaraugus County (2 seats)
 Cayuga County (3 seats)
 Chautauqua County (3 seats)
 Chemung County (1 seat)
 Chenango County (3 seats)
 Clinton County (1 seat)
 Columbia County (3 seats)
 Cortland County (2 seats)
 Delaware County (2 seats)
 Dutchess County (3 seats)
 Erie County (3 seats)
 Essex County (1 seat)
 Franklin County (1 seat)
 Genesee County (4 seats)
 Greene County (2 seats)
 Hamilton and Montgomery counties (3 seats)
 Herkimer County (2 seats)
 Jefferson County (3 seats)
 Kings County (2 seats)
 Lewis County (1 seat)
 Livingston County (2 seats)
 Madison County (3 seats)
 Monroe County (3 seats)
 The City and County of New York (13 seats)
 Niagara County (2 seats)
 Oneida County (4 seats)
 Onondaga County (4 seats)
 Ontario County (3 seats)
 Orange County (3 seats)
 Orleans County (1 seat)
 Oswego County (2 seats)
 Otsego County (3 seats)
 Putnam County (1 seat)
 Queens County (1 seat)
 Rensselaer County (3 seats)
 Richmond County (1 seat)
 Rockland County (1 seat)
 St. Lawrence County (2 seats)
 Saratoga County (2 seats)
 Schenectady County (1 seat)
 Schoharie County (2 seats)
 Seneca County (1 seat)
 Steuben County (3 seats)
 Suffolk County (2 seats)
 Sullivan County (1 seat)
 Tioga County (1 seat)
 Tompkins County (2 seats)
 Ulster County (2 seats)
 Warren County (1 seat)
 Washington (2 seats)
 Wayne County (2 seats)
 Westchester County (2 seats)
 Yates County (1 seat)

Note: There are now 62 counties in the State of New York. The counties which are not mentioned in this list had not yet been established, or sufficiently organized, the area being included in one or more of the abovementioned counties.

Assemblymen
The asterisk (*) denotes members of the previous Legislature who continued as members of this Legislature.

Party affiliations follow the vote on State officers on February 5.

Employees
 Clerk: Jarvis N. Lake
 Sergeant-at-Arms: Harley R. Luddington
 Doorkeeper: William C. Bloss
 Assistant Doorkeeper: Frederick Lamb

Notes

Sources
 The New York Civil List compiled by Franklin Benjamin Hough (Weed, Parsons and Co., 1858) [pg. 109 and 441 for Senate districts; pg. 131f for senators; pg. 148f for Assembly districts; pg. 220f for assemblymen]
 The History of Political Parties in the State of New-York, from the Ratification of the Federal Constitution to 1840 by Jabez D. Hammond (4th ed., Vol. 2, Phinney & Co., Buffalo, 1850; pg. 479 to 486)

061
1838 in New York (state)
1838 U.S. legislative sessions